Redmond Town Center is a mixed-use development and shopping center located in downtown Redmond, Washington. Owned and managed by Fairbourne Properties, Redmond Town Center has more than 110 shops, restaurants, lodging, and entertainment venues in an outdoor environment. It opened in 1997 on the site of a defunct municipal golf course along the north side of State Route 520.

DRA Advisors and JSH acquired the retail component of the Redmond Town Center in 2013, shortly after Shorenstein Properties bought the office portion, which is occupied by Microsoft and AT&T. In late 2019, the retail portion was sold to Fairbourne Properties.

History 
The site was formerly Redmond Golf Links, an 18 hole golf course that opened in 1932. In 1978, Winmar, a real estate company owned by Safeco Insurance. Winmar eventually closed the 120-acre property, and planned to develop the site into a mixed-use shopping mall. The project, named Maingate, was planned to include 1,350,000 square feet (125,000 m2 ) of retail space, along with office spaces, 160 residential units, and 25-30 acres of open space.

This project was met with controversy of Redmond residents, as them and candidates running for City Council said that the project would've made it harder for people to walk around the city and feared that Redmond would become more of an automotive city than a walkable city. The mayor allegedly rezoned the property without any processes or public hearings with the rest of the City Council.

In 1988, the city conditionally approved the project. Four department stores, Mervyn's, Frederick & Nelson, The Bon Marché, and JCPenney were signed to be major tenants of Maingate and planning continued for the project, with a construction date announced.

By 1992, Frederick & Nelson went out of business due to bankruptcy and the owner of Bon Marché, Federated Department Stores, briefly went bankrupt. These two events made the project go on a downward spiral that led to the demise of the project. 

However, also in 1992, the City of Redmond accepted another project on the same site by the same developer, Winmar. Redmond Town Center, which would've included a mixed-use town center that was similar to Maingate, but it was an outdoor center and it only had one department store. It included a decreased retail space, a walkable town center, hotels, and offices, and residential spaces This project was received more positively by residents and the City Council.

Groundbreaking for the development in 1995, with historical buildings being kept in tact while everything else in the site was demolished.

Redmond Town Center eventually opened. The complex had two floors on the retail section, both directing to stores and dining. The development included 674,287 square feet (65,000 m2 ) of retail space, numerous office buildings, two hotels being owned by Marriott, Marriott Hotels & Resorts and Residence Inn by Marriott, and The Bon Marché, Zany Brainy, REI, Larry's Market, Borders, Todai, and Cineplex Odeon as major anchors. Office spaces were leased by Microsoft, AT&T Wireless Services, and other tenants.

The development was built in stages, with the town center, offices, and hotels being built before the Bon Marché, as construction was officially finished by 2003. There were three strip malls connected to the development, Creekside Crossing along Redmond Way, a different center featuring Larry's, Cost Plus World Market, and Big 5 Sporting Goods, and a center including Zany Brainy, Bed Bath & Beyond, and other retail tenants.

After three year of opening, Zany Brainy shuttered from bankruptcy and FAO Schwarz dissolving the company in December 2003. Months after closing, Petco announced that they were moving into the former space in 2004 from Bear Creek Village, a shopping center nearby, to Redmond Town Center. It later opened in 2004 in its new space.

In 2005, as The Bon Marché was acquired by Macy's, the tenant was converted into Macy's. In 2008, Larry's Market shuttered as Haggen's bought the tenant, and briefly converted it into a Top Food & Drug in 2008 that closed in 2010. In 2013, the tenant was converted into a 24 Hour Fitness. In 2011, as a result of the company going bankrupt, Borders closed all their locations, including the Redmond location. It was left vacant until 2016, when it was divided into multiple tenants, with one being a Ducati dealership independently owned, a T-Mobile store opening, and an office building on the second floor location.

During 2010, Todai, a Japanese buffet, closed down due to unknown reason. In August of 2011, Haiku, another Japanese buffet. opened up on its former space.

In 2015, Claim Jumpers, a restaurant that sat outside of Redmond Town Center since it first opened, shuttered. Plans for a hotel that would be 160 room hotel and 7 stories high were made with Lodgeworks, the owner of Archer Hotels. Construction started in 2016, and In 2019, the hotel opened on top of the former Claim Jumpers restaurant.

In 2016, REI moved its store from Redmond Town Center to Bellevue, selling its building it was occupied in. In 2018, it was converted into Restoration Hardware before closing a few months later for unknown reasons.

In 2018, Macy's announced that it would be closing around 100 locations, including the one in Redmond Town Center. In 2019, the store was shuttered. In 2020, Amazon released plans of converting the former Macy's building into an Amazon office, while a few months later, the former REI was planned to be converted into a Volkswagen automotive cloud office.

As both offices opened in 2021, in 2022, the City of Redmond and Fairbourne Properties released plans of redeveloping the town center by building more mixed-use buildings over current parking lots. These buildings would include adapting more retail, residential units, and offices into the site. They plan to turn Redmond Town Center into a walkable urban center.

The town center wasn't affected as much as nearby shopping centers at the time during the COVID-19 pandemic in 2020, but during the pandemic, as part of the 200 other stores, Bed Bath & Beyond closed its doors and Haiku, in turn, shuttered in September of that year. However, during 2022, numerous tenants would sign with the town center, including H Mart, an Asian Supermarket, that would replace the former Bed Bath & Beyond, and a handful of restaurant spaces. In 2023, nearby tenant HobbyTown, whose building is about to be demolished due to a redevelopment on their former space and the Downtown Redmond Light Rail under construction near its current building, announced plans to move into the former American Eagle Outfitters space in a unknown date . In the same year, Daiso, a variety store, announced a opening in the former Victoria's Secret and Pink space in February of that year. Tous les Jours, a South Korean bakery, would also open their new location in the aforementioned H Mart building. Local restaurant and entertainment chain, Flatstick Pub, opened in February of the same year.

Major anchors
 Petco (Formerly Zany Brainy 1998-2003)
 iPic Theatres (Formerly Cineplex Odeon 1997-2008)
 Mayuri Foods (Formerly Pier 1 Imports 1997-2020)
 Flatstick Pub (Formerly Todai 1997-2010 and Haiku 2011-2022)
In 2022, Daiso announced they were opening a store in 2023 in the space where Victoria's Secret and Pink used to occupy. They will open their store with 7,957 square feet (740 m²) of space.

In the same year, H Mart announced plans to open a space in the former Bed Bath & Beyond, along with three restaurant tenants. The opening date is unknown.

Former anchors 

 Macy's, formerly The Bon Marché, 2003-2019 (Now an Amazon office)
 Restoration Hardware, 2018 (Formerly REI 1997-2016, now a Volkswagen office.)
 Bed Bath & Beyond 1997-2020, (Being converted into H Mart and 3 restaurant tenants, including Tous les Jours, opening in an unknown date)

Hotels
 Redmond Marriott Town Center
 Residence Inn by Marriott
 Archer Hotels

Office space
The majority of the office space at Redmond Town Center comprises six buildings of three to five stories. AT&T occupies the three on the west side of the RTC property, while Microsoft occupies the three on the east side. The administrative offices of the Lake Washington School District are housed in a smaller building to the west of the Marriott hotel. Amazon announced that it would house 600 employees at a  office complex at Redmond Town Center that will open in 2021 in the former Macy's.

References

External links

 

Shopping malls in King County, Washington
Shopping malls established in 1997
Buildings and structures in Redmond, Washington
1997 establishments in Washington (state)